The men's alpine skiing downhill was the third of six events of the alpine skiing programme at the 1952 Winter Olympics. It was held at Norefjell ski area on Saturday, 16 February, and started at 1 p.m. It followed the women's giant slalom on Thursday and men's giant slalom on Friday.

It was the second Olympic downhill race, which was first run as a separate event in 1948.

Defending world champion Zeno Colò of Italy won the gold, the only Olympic medal of his career; he was fourth in the other two events. More than a second behind was silver medalist Othmar Schneider, and Christian Pravda took the bronze.

Eighty-one alpine skiers from 27 nations competed.

Results
Saturday, 16 February 1952The race was started at 13:00 local time, (UTC +1).

References

External links
Official Olympic Report
 

1952
Men's alpine skiing at the 1952 Winter Olympics